Captain William Thomas Shaw (26 February 1879 – 20 October 1965) was Unionist Party Member of Parliament for Forfar for two periods, 1918 to 1922 and 1931 to 1945.

He was educated at the High School of Dundee and was admitted to the London Stock Exchange in 1901. In the 1910 general election he contested but lost the seat of Dunbartonshire. During World War 1, he served in the Royal Army Service Corps.

Shaw married Margret Cassilis in 1908. They remained married until her death in 1949. They had three daughters.

References

External links 

1879 births
1965 deaths
People educated at the High School of Dundee
Unionist Party (Scotland) MPs
Members of the Parliament of the United Kingdom for Scottish constituencies
UK MPs 1918–1922
UK MPs 1931–1935
UK MPs 1935–1945
British Army personnel of World War I
Royal Army Service Corps officers